Coffs Harbour High School is a government-funded co-educational comprehensive secondary day school, located in Coffs Harbour, in the Mid North Coast region of New South Wales, Australia.

Established in 1938, the school enrolled approximately 1,000 students in 2018, from Year 7 to Year 12, including nine percent of students who identified as Indigenous Australians and fifteen percent who were from a language background other than English. The school is operated by the NSW Department of Education; the principal is Peter South.

Notable alumni 
 Bob Browna former Australian politician, medical doctor, and environmentalist
 Mark McGowan30th Premier of Western Australia

See also

 List of government schools in New South Wales
 List of schools in Northern Rivers and Mid North Coast
 Education in Australia
 Coffs Harbour Senior College

References

External links 
 
 NSW Schools website

Public high schools in New South Wales
Education in Coffs Harbour
1938 establishments in Australia
Educational institutions established in 1938